The 2020 Pan American Cross Country Cup took place on February 29, 2020.  The races will be held at Bear Mountain in Victoria, British Columbia, Canada.

Medalists

Race results

Senior men's race (10 km)

Junior (U20) men's race (8 km)

Senior women's race (8 km)

Junior (U20) women's race (6 km)

Medal table (unofficial)

Note: Totals include both individual and team medals, with medals in the team competition counting as one medal.

Participation
According to an unofficial count, 183 athletes from 21 countries participated.

 (0)
 (0)
 (0)
 (0)
 (0)
 (0)
 (0)
 (0)
 (0)
 (0)
 (0)
 (0)
 (0)
 (0)
 (0)
 (0)
 (0)
 (0)
 (0)
 (0)
 (0)

See also
 2020 in athletics (track and field)
 Temporary Results

References

Pan American Cross Country Cup
Pan American Cross Country Cup
Pan American Cross Country Cup
Pan American Cross Country Cup
Cross country running in Canada
Pan American Cross Country Cup